Jennifer Stigile (born October 31, 1977) is an American actress and singer who is mostly known for voiceovers in Japanese video games published by Working Designs during the 1990s and early 2000s and for XSEED in 2010.  She also performed the vocals for many of these games, including "Wind's Nocturne (Luna's Boat Song)” from Lunar: Silver Star Story Complete.  A remix of this song was made into a song/video by Longcat, but did not give Stigile credit for the vocals.  Stigile also has performed in multiple radio jingles and commercials.

A Christian, Stigile has also performed for local religious functions hosted by the Horizon Christian Fellowship in the Rancho Santa Fe area.  Additionally, she has performed The Star-Spangled Banner at Petco Park on many occasions as part of the Horizon Praise Band, and later, the Horizon Worship Team.  Stigile is also featured on CDs with Mike Clark Band and After Eden, singing “Beauty in the Still” and “Your Beautiful Life”, amongst others.

In 2017/2018, Stigile collaborated with Cali Tucker from Season 6 of “The Voice” (also the niece of Tanya Tucker) and performed with Tucker throughout Las Vegas.

Filmography

Video games
 Lunar: Eternal Blue - Ruby, Jean
 Albert Odyssey: Legend of Eldean - Cirrus
 Magic Knight Rayearth - Umi Ryuzaki
 Lunar: Silver Star Story Complete - Royce
 Silhouette Mirage - Dynamis
 Lunar 2: Eternal Blue Complete - Ruby, Jean
 Growlanser III: The Dual Darkness - Annette Burns

Music
 Popful Mail - Ending Song
 Lunar: Eternal Blue - "Eternal Blue" and "Lucia's Theme"
 Magic Knight Rayearth - "Daring Dreams"
 Lunar: Silver Star Story Complete - "Wings" and "Wind's Nocturne"
 Silhouette Mirage - "Leave the Tears Behind"
 Vanguard Bandits - "Believe My Heart"
 Lunar 2: Eternal Blue Complete - "Eternal Blue [Rondo—Light and Shadows]" and "Lucia's Theme"
 Arc the Lad Collection - "Way of the Earth"
 Lunar: Silver Star Harmony - "Wings 2009" and "Nocturne of the Wind 2009"
 Growlanser III: The Dual Darkness - Opening Song “To Your Tomorrow”

See also
Sony Wonder
Sony Music Entertainment (Japan) Inc.
Working Designs

External links

1977 births
American Christians
Living people
21st-century American singers
21st-century American women singers